Kjellmyra is a village in Åsnes Municipality in Innlandet county, Norway.

References

Åsnes
Villages in Innlandet